Sean Barrett may refer to:

Seán Barrett (actor) (born 1940), British actor whose credits include Z-Cars
Sean Barrett (economist) (born 1944), Irish transport economist and Senator
Seán Barrett (politician) (born 1944), Irish Fine Gael TD
Sean Barrett (writer) (born 1959), American writer, nucleonicist, member of the Wikipedia Arbitration Committee